Geoff Metcalf is an American author, writer, and columnist. He was a nationally syndicated radio talk show host based in Washington, D.C. He was the Editor of CalNews.com. Currently, Metcalf is a broadcasting consultant, and author.

Biography
Metcalf is a former Green Beret. He is a retired Lieutenant Colonel of the United States Army Reserves and has commanded a Special Forces Operational Detachment and a Military Police Company in addition to various staff positions.

He was a columnist for the Sacramento Union and an editorial writer for the Evening Times in Rhode Island.

Metcalf was also a program director and talk show host at WAAB 1440, in Worcester, MA. in the early 1970s. He served as general manager of a small radio station (WBVD) in Beverly, MA in the early 1980s. In the mid-1980s he was President of Wade Advertising in Sacramento, CA.

He has done considerable fill-in and vacation talk show host work in numerous major markets (NYC, DC, Dallas, etc.).

Metcalf was part of the early development of WorldNetDaily and the first non-Joe Farah columnist. He wrote a weekly column for WorldNetDaily exclusively for over five years.

At the same time, he became involved with Chris Ruddy and Dana Allen (co-founders of NewsMax). Metcalf helped host several live events in the Bay Area which featured Larry Nichols, Trooper Larry Patterson, and other harsh Bill Clinton critics.

Metcalf was Master of Ceremonies for both WorldNetDaily and NewsMax events in Los Angeles, San Francisco, and Washington D.C.

During Operation Iraqi Freedom Metcalf was a military pundit and appeared on numerous radio and television programs (Fox & Friends, Bob Grant on WOR, Lionel, G. Gordon Liddy, Al Rantel on KABC, Mancow, Al Malmberg), and several Canadian and European stations.

Prior to national syndication, Metcalf was a radio talk show host for San Francisco radio station KSFO, as well as Sacramento Radio stations KSTE and KTKZ plus KPLA-770, a station licensed to Riverbank, California but serving Sacramento.

He currently is an author and narrates audiobooks for Audible.com. He writes a weekly column for a number of online news websites, including NewsMax for which he is a pundit.

Awards

He is a recipient of the NRA Defender of Freedom Award, a Golden Microphone Award, and Eagle Forum's Media Person of the Year 2000.

Books by Geoff Metcalf
Will in Acquinistere (Amazon Shorts Best Seller)
The Terrorist Killers
In The Arena.
ArkDar/The Two That Are One
ArkDar/Genesis
Will

See also
Michael Graham (radio personality)

References

External links 
Geoff Metcalf Website

American radio personalities
Living people
Place of birth missing (living people)
Year of birth missing (living people)